Elections for the Massachusetts House of Representatives were held on November 7, 2006, with all of the 160 seats in the House up for election. The term of Representatives elected is two years, January 2007 until January 2009. The 2006 Massachusetts Senate election occurred on the same day as the House election, along with Federal and Gubernatorial elections.

Control of the House
The House session ending in January 2007 consists of 139 (87%) Democrats, and 21 (13%) Republicans. The Democrats hold more than a two-thirds majority of the seats in the House. For the Republicans to break that two-thirds majority, they were required to gain 33 Democratic-held seats, a feat that was impossible to accomplish in 2006 as only 32 Democrats faced Republican challengers. Similarly, Republicans could not hope to gain the 59 seats needed to take control of the chamber, as there were not enough challengers to make that possible.  Conversely, the Democrats challenged only 8 of the 21 Republican-held seats.

128 of the 160 seats were left uncontested by one of the major parties in the 2006 election.

Election results
Two seats changed parties, both Republican seats that switched to  Democrats. In the 4th Barnstable District, Sarah Peake (D-Provincetown) defeated Aaron Maloy (R-Orleans) to take the seat of retiring Shirley Gomes (R). In the 13th Middlesex, incumbent Susan Pope (R-Wayland) was defeated by Thomas Conroy (D-Wayland). No other incumbents were defeated, and all other open seats were retained by the party holding them.

Barnstable County

Primary Results

Barnstable, Dukes and Nantucket Counties

Berkshire County

Bristol County

Essex County

Franklin County

Hampden County

Hampshire County

Middlesex County

Norfolk County

Plymouth County

Suffolk County

Worcester County

See also
 List of Massachusetts General Courts

Sources
http://www.mass.gov/legis/repdis03.htm, accessed March 11, 2006
Office of Campaign and Political Finance Commonwealth of Massachusetts http://www.mass.gov/ocpf/, accessed March 11, 2006
http://www.sec.state.ma.us/ele/eleres/stateeleres04.pdf, accessed September 29, 2006

References

External links
 
 

State House
House 2006
Mass